Bachs is a municipality in the district of Dielsdorf in the canton of Zürich in Switzerland.

History
Bachs is first mentioned in 1100 as Fusebach and Fuisipach.  In 1384 the village section of Altbachs (Old Bachs) was mentioned as Obern Fisibach.

Geography

 
Of this area, 49% is used for agricultural purposes, while 44.1% is forested. Of the rest of the land, 6.8% is settled (buildings or roads) and the remainder (0.1%) is non-productive (rivers, glaciers or mountains).

The municipality is located at the mouth of the Fisibach stream.  Bachs is a village with two centers which, since the fire of 1763, are known as Alt- and Neubachs (Old and New Bachs).

Demographics
, 6.0% of the population was made up of foreign nationals. Over the last 10 years the population has decreased at a rate of -4%. Most of the population speaks German  (95.8%), with French being second most common ( 1.0%) and Spanish being third ( 0.9%).

In the 2007 election the most popular party was the SVP which received 55.1% of the vote.  The next three most popular parties were the SPS (11.6%), the Green Party (10%) and the CSP (6.4%).

The age distribution of the population is children and teenagers (0–19 years old) make up 25% of the population, while adults (20–64 years old) make up 62.4% and seniors (over 64 years old) make up 12.7%.  About 77.8% of the population (between age 25-64) have completed either non-mandatory upper secondary education or additional higher education (either university or a Fachhochschule).

Bachs has an unemployment rate of 0.79%.  , there were 92 people employed in the primary economic sector and about 29 businesses involved in this sector.  36 people are employed in the secondary sector and there are 3 businesses in this sector.  171 people are employed in the tertiary sector, with 19 businesses in this sector.
The historical population is given in the following table:

References

External links

 Official website 
 

Municipalities of the canton of Zürich